The Athletics at the 2016 Summer Paralympics – Men's 400 metres T47 event at the 2016 Paralympic Games took place on 16–17 September 2016, at the Estádio Olímpico João Havelange.

Heats

Heat 1 
10:30 16 September 2016:

Heat 2 
10:37 16 September 2016:

Heat 3 
10:44 16 September 2016:

Final 
18:05 17 September 2016:

Notes

Athletics at the 2016 Summer Paralympics
2016 in men's athletics